Un Pescador is a sculpture by Agustín Franco. There is a statue in the collection of Museo Nacional de Arte, and a statue installed across from Alameda Central, in Mexico City.

See also
 1858 in art

References

External links

 

1858 sculptures
Outdoor sculptures in Mexico City
Sculptures of men in Mexico
Statues in Mexico City